The rufous-necked hornbill (Aceros nipalensis) is a species of hornbill in Bhutan, northeastern India, especially in Arunachal Pradesh, Indian Subcontinent and Southeast Asia. It is locally extinct in Nepal due to hunting and significant loss of habitat. There are less than 10,000 adults left in the wild. The underparts, neck and head are rich rufous in the male, but black in the female.

Taxonomy 
The scientific name Buceros nipalensis was coined by Brian Houghton Hodgson in 1829 who described several rufous-necked hornbills caught by hunters in sal forest in Nepal.
It was placed in the genus Aceros by John Edward Gray in 1844.

Description

The head, neck, and lower body of the male are coloured rufous, with deeper colouration on the flanks and abdomen. The middle primaries and the lower half of the tail are tipped white. The rest of the hornbill's plumage is a glossy dark-green and black. The lower tail-covert feathers are coloured chestnut mixed with black.
The female is black, except for the end-portion of her tail and the tips of the middle primaries, which are white.  Juvenile hornbills resemble adults of the same sex, but lack the ridges at the base of the upper beak. The beak lacks a true caique but is thickened at its base. It has a number of dark ridges on the upper beak which are absent in the young and increase in number with age up to about seven. The commissure of the beaks is broken in both sexes.

Distribution and habitat
The rufous-necked hornbill has the northernmost distribution ranging from Northeast India, central Bhutan to western Thailand and northwestern Vietnam. Within this area, it lives in 90 protected areas comprising  of protected forest but only including 7% of optimal hornbill habitat.
Mahananda Wildlife Sanctuary in West Bengal represents its westernmost limit; it has also been recorded in  Buxa Tiger Reserve, Manas National Park, Eaglenest Wildlife Sanctuary, Sessa Orchid Sanctuary, Kamlang Wildlife Sanctuary, Namdapha National Park and Pakke Tiger Reserve.

Behaviour and ecology
The nesting period is from March to June, the trees preferred are tall and have broad girths. These hornbill communities move between one forest to another depending on seasonally to forage from fruiting trees that change with local conditions.
Describing the egg, Hume (1889) states:
The egg is a broad oval, compressed somewhat towards one end, so as to be slightly pyriform. The shell is strong and thick, but coarse and entirely glossless, everywhere pitted with minute pores. In colour it is a very dirty white, with a pale dirty yellowish tinge, and everywhere obscurely stippled, when closely examined, with minute purer white specks, owing to the dirt not having got down into the bottoms of the pores. It measures 2-25 by 1'75 (inches).

Conservation
Already listed in CITES Appendices I, the species is vulnerable but occurs in a number of protected areas in India, China, Thailand and Bhutan. Due to increased information coming in about range and extent, it has been suggested that the rufous-necked hornbill be downgraded from IUCN status "Vulnerable" to "Near Threatened".

Recent initiatives by the Wildlife Trust of India, Arunachal Pradesh Forest Department and other citizens to conserve hornbills, which also target the rufous-necked hornbill, are the Hornbill Nest Adoption Programme, and a programme for replacing the use of real beaks with fibre-made replicas.

In culture

The rufous-necked hornbill occurs in Sanskrit literature under the epithet vārdhrīnasa, a term which at times also has been used to refer to other Bucerotidae.

In Arunachal Pradesh, rufous-necked hornbills have been hunted by tribals for their feathers and beaks.

References

External links
 ARKive - images and movies of the rufous-necked hornbill (Aceros nipalensis)

rufous-necked hornbill
Birds of Bhutan
Birds of Northeast India
Birds of Laos
Birds of Myanmar
rufous-necked hornbill
Taxa named by Brian Houghton Hodgson